The Puiseaux is a small river in the Loiret department, central France, left tributary of the Loing. Its source is in the commune of Les Choux. It flows north to Montargis, where it empties into the Loing. It is unrelated to the commune of Puiseaux.

References

Puiseaux
Rivers of Centre-Val de Loire
Rivers of Loiret